Sarah Harper is a gerontologist.

Sarah or Sara Harper is also the name of:

 Sara J. Harper (born 1926), former member of the Eighth District Court of Appeals
 Sara Harper, character on All I Desire

See also
Robert Black (1947–2016), murdered Sarah Jayne Harper in 1986